Hwang Woo-yea (Hanja: 黃祐呂; born 3 August 1947) is a Korean jurist, politician, and former chairman of the Saenuri Party.  Hwang represents the electorate centred on Yeonsu District, Incheon in the National Assembly of South Korea.

Hwang studied law at Seoul National University. He was a judge in courts in Seoul and other jurisdictions in South Korea before entering politics. Hwang has been elected to the constituency he represents five times.

In 2016 Hwang placed third on the Rainbow Vote list of 22 most homophobic politicians. He is well known for his role as the chair of the National Breakfast Prayer Committee meeting and as a key architect of anti-gay legislations in Korea. In 2014 he participated in organizing the International Solidarity Agency to Stop Global Homosexuality, a collaboration between Korean evangelicals and their counterparts in Haiti.

Education
 Graduated from Incheon Songnim National School
 Graduated from Incheon Middle School
 Graduation from Jaemulpo High School
 L.L.B Faculty of Law, Seoul National University
 Master's in Constitutional Studies, Seoul National University
 Doctor's in Constitution Studies, Seoul National University

References

Liberty Korea Party politicians
Seoul National University alumni
Living people
Deputy Prime Ministers of South Korea
Members of the National Assembly (South Korea)
1947 births
Changwon Hwang clan
Education ministers of South Korea